Comfort food is food that provides a nostalgic or sentimental value to someone, and may be characterized by its high caloric nature, high carbohydrate level, or simple preparation. The nostalgia may be specific to an individual, or it may apply to a specific culture.

Definition and history
The term comfort food has been traced back at least to 1966, when the Palm Beach Post used it in a story: "Adults, when under severe emotional stress, turn to what could be called 'comfort food'—food associated with the security of childhood, like mother's poached egg or famous chicken soup." According to a research by April White at JSTOR, it might have been Liza Minnelli who used the term for the first time in its modern meaning in an interview, admitting to craving a hamburger.

When the term first appeared, newspapers used it in quotation marks. In the 1970s, the most popular comfort food in the United States were various potato dishes and chicken soup, but even at the time, the definition varied from person to person. During the next decades, the nature of comfort food changed in the USA, shifting from savory dishes to sweet ones, while comfort food themed cookbooks started to spread and restaurants started to offer items labelled as such, when originally the term was used for food items consumed home alone. Worldwide diet trends, emerging in the 1990s, like the low fat or the low-carb diet were unable to end the cravings for comfort food. According to White, the COVID-19 pandemic that hit the world in 2020 further strengthened people's need for comfort food that evokes nostalgia and the feeling of belonging.

Psychological studies
Consuming energy-dense, high calorie, high fat, salt or sugar foods, such as ice cream or french fries, may trigger the reward system in the human brain, which gives a distinctive pleasure or temporary sense of emotional elevation and relaxation. These feelings can also be induced by psychoactive ingredients found in other foods, such as coffee and chocolate. When psychological conditions are present, people often use comfort food to treat themselves. Those with negative emotions tend to eat unhealthy food in an effort to experience the instant gratification that comes with it, even if only short-lived.

One study divided college-students' comfort-food identifications into four categories (nostalgic foods, indulgence foods, convenience foods, and physical comfort foods) with a special emphasis on the deliberate selection of particular foods to modify mood or affect, and indications that the medical-therapeutic use of particular foods may ultimately be a matter of mood-alteration.

The identification of particular items as comfort food may be idiosyncratic, though patterns are detectable. In one study of American preferences, "males preferred warm, hearty, meal-related comfort foods (such as steak, casseroles, and soup) while females instead preferred comfort foods that were more snack related (such as chocolate and ice cream). In addition, younger people preferred more snack-related comfort foods compared to those over 55 years of age." The study also revealed strong connections between consumption of comfort foods and feelings of guilt.

Comfort food consumption is seen as a response to emotional stress and, consequently, as a key contributor to the epidemic of obesity in the United States. The provocation of specific hormonal responses leading selectively to increases in abdominal fat is seen as a form of self-medication.

Further studies suggest that consumption of comfort food is triggered in men by positive emotions, and by negative ones in women. The stress effect is particularly pronounced among college-aged women, with only 33% reporting healthy eating choices during times of emotional stress. For women specifically, these psychological patterns may be maladaptive.

A therapeutic use of these findings includes offering comfort foods or "happy hour" beverages to anorectic geriatric patients whose health and quality of life otherwise decreases with reduced oral intake.

By region
A partial list by region of comfort foods around the world.

Afghanistan 

Comfort foods in Afghanistan are:

 Aushak – stuffed dumplings and sauce
 Bolani – filled flatbread
 Borani Banjan or Borani-e-Banjan – baked eggplant with yogurt sauce
 Borani Kadoo or Borani-e-Kado – sweet and savory braised pumpkin with yogurt sauce
 Chainaki – 
 Chalaw or Challow – steamed rice with spices
 Kabuli palaw or Qabuli Pulao – steamed rice with raisins, carrots, and lamb
 Karahai – meat cooked in a traditional karahi pot
 Kebab – grilled skewered meat
 Korma Gosht or Qorma-e-Gosht – braised meat
 Mantu – meat-stuffed dumpling
 Naan – flatbread
 Sabzi Palu – spinach (sabzi) with spices
 Sher Berinj – rice pudding

Australia, New Zealand and South Africa

Comfort foods in Australia, New Zealand and South Africa may include:

 Braised lamb shanks
 Bread and butter pudding
 Butterscotch apple dumplings
 Casserole (beef or chicken)
 Chicken soup
 Golden syrup pikelets
 Honey and oat slices
 Hot chips
 Lamingtons
 Mashed potatoes
 Meat pie
 Pea and ham soup
 Pie floater
 Porridge, topped with brown sugar or honey, yogurt, nuts, and fruit
 Potato wedges
 Pumpkin soup
 Rice custard
 Roast meat (beef, chicken, or pork with crackling)
 Roast potatoes
 Sausage and mash
 Sausage roll
 Shepherd's pie
 Spaghetti
 Steak and kidney pie
 Sticky date pudding
 Vegemite or Marmite on toast

Canada
 

 Butter tart / Tarte au sucre – small sweet tart-shaped pastries
Cake
Cheesecake
Chili and beans
Chocolate bars
Cookies
Fish and chips
Fried chicken
Fried rice
Ginger beef
Grilled cheese sandwich
Hamburger
Ice cream
Lasagna
Macaroni and cheese
Nanaimo bar
Pancakes with maple syrup
Pea soup
Pierogies
Pizza
Potatoes such as French fries, Hash browns, Mashed potatoes, Potato chips, and Potato salad
Poutine
Rhubarb pie
Scrambled eggs on toast
Tourtière – meat pie with pork and lard

Catalonia

Comfort foods in Catalonia include:

 Pa amb tomàquet (bread smeared with tomato and olive oil, and sometimes garlic)
 Allioli (Aioli) (sauce which is an emulsion of garlic and olive oil. The name literally means "garlic and oil" in Catalan) 
 Catalan-style cod (with raisins and pine nuts)
 Escalivada (various grilled vegetables)
 Escudella i carn d'olla (a broth, it may be served as soup with pasta and minced meats and vegetables, or as the soup first and then the rest)
 Canelons (Cannelloni with a bechamel sauce)
  Esqueixada (salted cod salad with tomato and onion)
 Mongetes amb botifarra (beans and pork sausage)
  (a seafood casserole)
 Savoury coca  ("Sea and Mountain") dishes, which combine meat and seafood
 Embotits, a generic name for different kinds of cured pork meat, including fuet (a characteristic type of dried sausage), salchichón or llonganissa (salami) and different kinds of cold cut botifarra.
 Calçot (specially cultivated onion, grilled and served as a "Calçotada")
 Caragols a la llauna (cooked snails)
 Sonsos and many other Mediterranean fresh fish
 Crema catalana (custard made from egg yolks, milk, sugar, lemon zest and cinnamon)
 Panellets (bite-sized cakes in different shapes, mostly round, made mainly of marzipan)

United Kingdom

United Kingdom comfort foods include:

 Bacon butty (bacon sandwich)
 Bangers and mash – sausages and mashed potatoes
 Cauliflower cheese
 Chicken Tikka Masala
 Cornish pasty
 Cottage pie (Shepherd's pie)
 Custard
 Curry – India-inspired stew over rice
 Egg and chips
 Egg and soldiers – toast sliced into approximately six to eight pieces lengthwise, to dip into soft-boiled egg yolk
 Fish and chips
 Fruit Crumble – stewed fruit with crumbly topping
 Full English breakfast
 Lancashire hotpot
 Pies
 Cheese pie, with potatoes or other savory ingredients
 Fish pie
 Pork pie
 Steak and kidney pie
 Potatoes
 Jacket potato
 Mashed potatoes
 Puddings
 Bread and butter pudding
 Jam Roly-Poly – suet pudding rolled in a spiral with jam
 Rice pudding
 Spotted dick – steamed pudding with dried fruit
 Sticky toffee pudding
 Treacle pudding
 Roasted meat, such as roast beef or chicken
 Scotch egg – hard-boiled egg baked in sausage
 Soups and stews 
 Beef stew with dumplings
 Cock-a-leekie soup
 Lobscouse or lobscows – meat stew
 Potato, leek, and Stilton soup
 Stottie cake – heavy, round bread
 Toad in the hole – sausages baked in Yorkshire pudding
 Toast
 Baked beans on toast
 Welsh Rarebit – hot cheese sauce on toast
 Toastie – grilled sandwich
 Yorkshire pudding

 Egypt 

 Basbousa – sweet unleavened cake
 Falafel – fried bean ball
 Fatteh – meat soup on cooked rice with crisp flatbread with garlic sauce
 Ful medames – bean stew
 Hawawshi – pita bread stuffed with flavored meat
 Kushari – casserole of rice, macaroni, and vegetables
 Macarona béchamel – baked pasta dish with ground meat and béchamel sauce
 Sahlab – winter beverage from Orchis flour
 Mulukhiyah – soup or stew made with jute mallow leaves
 Om Ali – Pastry mixed with milk, nuts and sometimes coconut flakes topped with cream or butter and baked

France

Crème caramel – custard dessert
French onion soup – onion soup with cheese and bread
Gratin dauphinois – potato slices baked with cream
Pâté – cold meat paste
Pot-au-feu – beef stew

 Germany 

German comfort foods may include the following foods:

Arme Ritter
Auszogne
Bouletten, Frikadellen, Fleischpflanzerl etc.
Bratkartoffeln
Currywurst
 Flädlesuppe
Fleischsalat
Frankfurter
Franzbrötchen
Gaisburger Marsch
Hamburger Aalsuppe
Hamburger Labskaus
Kartoffelpuffer
Käsespätzle
 Klöße
Kohlrouladen
Leberkäse
Laugenbrezn, Laugengebäck
Maultaschen
Mett
 Münchner Weißwürscht
Nürnberger Lebkuchen
Nürnberger Rostbratwurst
Obazda
Pichlstoana
Regensburger
Rote Grütze
 Rindsrouladen
Sauerbraten
Saumagen
Schwäbische Spätzle
Schlachtplatte
Schnitzel
Schweinshaxn
Spanferkel
Steckerlfisch
Schweinsbraten

Greece
 
Pastitsio
Moussaka
Gemista
Gyros
 Keftedakia – meatballs
 Koulourakia
Dolmadakia
 Souvlaki

Hong Kong

Baked Pork Chop Rice – a type of Hong Kong-style western cuisine
Cart noodle – an à la carte noodle dish traditionally sold using carts
Cha Chaan Teng – a Hong Kong style place to eat comfort food
Dim Sum – small bite-sized portions of food served in small steamer baskets during yum cha
Egg Tart
Hotpot
Macaroni in broth – a type of Hong Kong-style western cuisine
Pineapple Bun – a type of pastry that resembles a pineapple
Put chai ko – a palm-sized pudding cake snack
Siu Mei (including char siu) – meats roasted on spits over an open fire or in a large rotisserie oven

 Hungary 

 Aranygaluska – dough balls rolled in a mixture of sugar and crushed nuts
 Goulash soup
 Chicken soup
 Lángos – yeast dough deep fried in oil with various toppings
 Madártej – meringue floating on crème anglaise
 Chicken paprikash
  – potato stew with paprika
 Pörkölt – meat stew with paprika
 Puliszka – polenta with toppings
 Rántott hús – a type of Snitzel; but also fried chicken is called the same way
 Tejbegríz – Semolina pudding 
 Tojásos nokedli – small, plump soft noodles with eggs

India

 Biryani – Mutton, chicken, beef or lamb
 Chaat
 Curd rice – Rice mixed with yogurt
 Cutlet
 Daal chawal – particularly in North India
 Fish fry
 Kachori
 Kadhi chawal - curd curry with rice
 Rolls
 Maachh-bhaat
 Momo
 Sambar
 Samosa
 Puri – Fried flatbread
 Masala Dosa – rice crepes, with or without a filling of potatoes and onion
 Khichdi – Made with Rice and Legumes (lentils, mung beans)
 Pav bhaji – Curry served with buttered buns.
 Radhaballavi – Deep-fried flatbread with a filling
 Rajma chawal – rice with beans
 Rasam and Curd rice – particularly in South India

Indonesia

Some popular Indonesian foods are considered to be comfort food, usually served hot or warm, and either soupy or with a soft texture. Most of them are high in carbs or fat, such as congee, fried rice, and noodles which are high in carbs; while meatballs and grilled skewered meats contain fair amounts of fat and salt. Comfort foods often are the kind of food that provides nostalgic sentiments, as they often called masakan rumahan (home cooking) or masakan ibu (mother's dishes). In Indonesia, the warm and soft texture of bubur ayam is believed to help people to recover during convalescence. Sayur sop or sup ayam is Indonesian chicken soup that often sought during flu. The warm soup contains chunk of chicken, bits of potato, carrot, and common green bean served in chicken stock.

Some Indonesian comfort foods are traditional Indonesian food and some are derived from Chinese influences. For some Indonesians, especially those who are abroad, comfort food might also be a certain brand or type of Indonesian instant noodle, such as Indomie Mi goreng. Indonesian comfort foods include:

Bakmi or mie ayam – noodles (mi) with pork (bak) or chicken (ayam)
Bakso – meatball soup
Bubur ayam – chicken congee
Gado-gado – salad containing vegetables, tempeh and egg in peanut sauce
Indomie Mi goreng – fried noodle
Nasi goreng – fried rice
Nasi tim – steamed chicken rice
Sayur sop or sup ayam – Indonesian chicken and vegetables soup
Sate – skewered barbecue with peanut sauce
Soto ayam – spicy chicken soup

Ireland

 Bangers and mash
 Coddle
 Colcannon
 Fish and chips
 Full Irish breakfast
 Irish stew
 Shepherd's pie
 Soda bread
 Spice bag
 3-in-1 (egg-fried rice, chips, and curry sauce)

Italy

 Bruschetta
 Cacciucco – fish stew
 Crostini – small toasted bread slices with toppings
Gnocchi – small soft dough dumplings
Lasagne – flat noodles (pasta) layered with meat, cheese and tomato sauce
Pasta all'amatriciana – pasta with guanciale, tomato sauce and pecorino cheese
Pasta alla carbonara – pasta with egg guanciale, and pecorino cheese
Nutella – sweet spread of cocoa and hazelnuts
 Panna cotta – sweetened cream thickened with gelatin
Pizza – baked flatbread with toppings
 Porchetta – boneless pork roast
Risotto

Japan

 Curry Rice/Kare Raisu – Stewed vegetables - most commonly potato, onion, and carrot - in a mild curry sauce, sometimes with meat
 Chazuke/ochazuke – rice with green tea
 Miso soup – soybean-flavored clear soup
 Mochi – rice cake
 Onigiri – rice ball
 Ramen – soup with thin noodles

 Takoyaki – octopus balls
 Tempura – battered, deep-fried pieces of meat or vegetables
 Udon – soup with thick noodles

Philippines

 Adobo – A salt and vinegar marinated meat stew, with a large amount of local and regional variations.
 Arroz Caldo / Lugaw – A thick, savory rice porridge, often served as breakfast, on rainy days, or when sick.
 Batchoy – A noodle soup with a variety of meats.
 Filipino spaghetti - Sweet and savory spaghetti
 Ginataan – A coconut cream-based dessert soup with candied banana, sticky rice balls, sagó (tapioca balls), taro, and langkâ (jackfruit).
 Bulalo – A beef bone marrow soup.
 Champorado – Chocolate rice porridge, sometimes served savory (as with tuyô)
 Dinuguan - A pork blood and offal stew.
 Halo-halo – A cold, crushed ice dessert dish of mixed sweets in fruits, with milk and topped with ice cream and leche flan.
 Kare-kare – A stew of ox tripe and oxtail in a peanut sauce. It is regarded as a local variant of Indian curry.
 Lumpia – Fried or fresh spring rolls with vegetable or meat filling.
 Lomi – A hot noodle soup with distinctly thick egg noodles.
 Pancit – A class of noodles, almost always fried or stir-fried, and often served during birthday celebrations.
 puto – Steamed rice cakes
 Sinampalukan - Sour, tamarind-based chicken soup
 Sinigang – A classification of sour soups with different configurations of meats, vegetables, and souring agents.
 Sopas - A creamy soup (usually made with chicken) with elbow macaroni.
 Suman – Another type of glutinous rice cake
 Tsokolate – Hot chocolate drink made with cacao, served with or without milk.

Poland

Some Polish comfort food include:

 Soups and stews
 Bigos – "hunters' stew"
 Barszcz z uszkami – clear beetroot soup with forest mushrooms dumplings
 Gulasz – goulash / meat and vegetable stew
Kapuśniak – sauerkraut soup
 Rosół – chicken soup with fine noodles
 Zupa grzybowa – wild mushroom soup
 Zupa ogórkowa – sour cucumber soup
 Zupa pomidorowa – clear tomato soup with rice or noodles
 Zupa szczawiowa – sorrel soup served with boiled egg
 Żurek – sour rye soup
 Budyń waniliowy z malinami – vanilla pudding with raspberries
 Kotlet schabowy – pork schnitzel
 Golonka – stewed or roasted ham hock
 Kopytka – small potato dumpling
 Łazanki – large flat noodles with fried sauerkraut
  – pasta with cream and strawberries
  – pancakes with milk curd
 Pierogi – filled dumplings
 Placki ziemniaczane – potato pancakes
 Sernik – baked cheesecake
  – pickled herring
 Zapiekanka – toasted open-face sandwich

Puerto Rico

Some Puerto Rican comfort foods include:

 Arroz con gandules – rice with pigeon peas
 Arroz con pollo – rice with chicken
 Bistec encebollado – steak and onions
 Carne Guisada – stewed beef
 Carne mechada – Puerto Rican style meatloaf
 Churrasco – grilled flank or skirt steak
 Cuchifritos and Fritanga – assortments of fried appetizers (alcapurrias, bacalaitos, pastelitos/pastelillos, piononos, sorullos/sorullitos)
 Habichuelas guisadas con calabaza – beans stewed with pumpkin
 Lechón asado – roast pork
 Mixta – white rice, stewed beans with pumpkin and stewed meat with potatoes and carrots
 Mofongo and trifongo – fried mashed green plantains
 Mofongo relleno de mariscos, carne o pollo – Fried mashed green plantains stuffed with seafood, meat or chicken
 Pasteles – Puerto Rican tamales
 Pastelón de plátano maduro – ripe banana casserole with ground beef and cheddar cheese
 Pinchos – Puerto Rican skewers
 Tostones – fried plantain slices

Russia

Russian comfort foods may include:

 Bliny – pancakes
 Borscht
 Dressed herring – layered herring salad
 Golubtsy – cabbage rolls
 Kasha – buckwheat porridge
 Kotlety – meatballs
 Kholodets – savory gelatin
 Kvass – fermented drink made with bread
 Napoleon – layered pastry
 Okroshka – cold vegetable soup
 Oladyi – small thick pancakes or fritters
 Olivier salad – vegetable salad
 Pelmeni – meat-filled dumpling
 Pirozhki – buns with various fillings
 Rassolnik – pickled soup
 Shashlik – skewered and grilled cubes of meat
 Shchi – cabbage soup
 Solyanka – spicy and sour soup 
 Syrniki – cottage cheese pancakes
 Ukha – clear, fish-based soup
 Vareniki – filled dumplings (pierogi)

South Korea 

 Tteokbokki – rice cakes in spicy chili stew
 Shin Ramyun – instant noodles by Nongshim
 Kimbap – cooked rice rolled in seaweed and stuffed with vegetables or meat
 Samgyeopsal – roasted pork belly
 Mandu – dumplings with various fillings
 Soups and stews
 Kimchi jjigae – spicy stew made with kimchi
 Haejang-guk –  vegetables and meat in beef broth
 Sundubu-jjigae – soft tofu stew
 Seolleongtang – ox bone soup
 Budae-jjigae – "army stew" with noodles, Spam, vegetables and other ingredients
 Kalguksu – soup with handmade noodles

Spain

 
 Castañas asadas – roasted chestnuts
 Chocolate con churros – hot chocolate drink with fried dough
 Cordero asado – grilled lamb
 Fried seafood, such as boquerones fritos (fried anchovies) and calamares fritos (fried squid)
 Gazpacho – cold vegetable soup
 Jamón serrano – Serrano ham
 Paella – rice with saffron, cooked in a shallow pan
 Sausage, such as chorizo, morcilla, and salchichón
 Sobao – sweet bread
 Stew, such as cocido madrileño (Madrid stew)
 Tarta de Santiago – almond cake or tart
 Torreznos – bacon
 Tortilla española or tortilla de patata'' – potato-onion omelet

Switzerland

Traditional Swiss cuisine is characterized by its simplicity and extensive use of dairy products like cheese, cream and butter. Fruits (often apple compote) are also used in many (main) dishes, notably Älplermagronen and Maluns.
 
Älplermagronen
Capuns
Cholera
Fondue
Maluns
Pizzoccheri
Raclette
Rösti (with various accompaniments)
Wähe (with various ingredients)

Taiwan

 Beef noodle soup
 Dan zai noodles – noodles and prawn with broth
 Minced pork rice
 Oyster omelette
 Red bean soup
 Small sausage in large sausage – grilled sausage in a rice casing
 Tangyuan – filled rice dumplings in sweet syrup

Turkey

Some Turkish comfort foods are:

 Mantı – spicy meat dumpling
 Kuru fasulye – bean and tomato stew
 Pilav – rice dish
 Mercimek Çorbası – a soup based on lentils
 Börek – baked filled pastries, a wide variety of regional variations of börek exists
 Menemen - commonly eaten for breakfast
 Yaprak Sarma - stuffed grape leaves
 Gözleme - a stuffed flatbread , commonly stuffed with spinach, minced meat and potato mash
 Lahmacun
 Pide
 Tarhana soup

Ukraine 

Ukrainian comfort foods include, but aren't limitied to:

 Borscht — beetroots soup, also there are few variants:
 Green borscht
 White borscht
 Cabbage borscht
 Deruny — potato pancakes with sour cream
 Holubtsi — small, medium or large rolls with prepared rice
 Cabbage roll
 Grape leaves roll 
 Kasha — kind of porridge
 Kholodets —
 Kolach — sweet, round shaped pastry
 Mlynci — pancakes.
 Nalysnyky — pancakes with fillings
 Pampushky — small savory or sweet yeast-raised bun
 Pyrizhky — baked or fried small donuts with different (mostly fruits or meat) fillings.
 Syrnyky — fried quark pancakes, garnished with sour cream
 Varennia — jam
 Varenyky — Filled dumplings cooked at boiling water
 Vinehret — Beans and potato salad colored with beetroots

United States

American comfort foods may include the following foods:

 Apple pie
 Beef stew
 Biscuits and gravy
 Burritos
 Cake 
 Casseroles
 Chicken and dumplings
 Chicken fried steak
 Chicken soup
 Chili
 Chili mac
 Chocolate chip cookies
 Chowders: Clam chowder, Shrimp chowder, Corn chowder, etc.
 Cornbread
 Corned beef and cabbage
 Cupcakes
 Fluffernutter
 French fries
 Fried chicken
 Green bean casserole
 Green chile stew
 Grilled cheese sandwich and tomato soup
 Grits
 Hotdish
 Ice cream
 Lasagna
 Macaroni and cheese
 Mashed potatoes
 Meatloaf
 Peanut butter
 Pepperoni rolls
 Pizza
 Pot roast
 Red beans and rice
 Tamale pie
 Tuna casserole

See also

Diet food
Dish (food)
Emotional eating
Food group
Food presentation
Haute cuisine
List of foods
List of nutrition guides
Outline of food preparation
Portion size
Whole food

References

Further reading

External links

 

Eating disorders
Food and drink terminology
Nostalgia
Obesity
Psychological stress